Make Love to the Judges with Your Eyes is the first full-length album by Pony Up! It was released on May 9, 2006, by the all-female indie pop band based in Montreal, Quebec, Canada, formed on New Year's Eve 2002.

Track listing
 "Dance for Me" – 4:32
 "The Truth About Cats and Dogs (Is That They Die)" – 3:51
 "Possible Harm" – 4:56
 "The Best Offence" – 4:28
 "Only Feelgood" – 4:44
 "What's Free Is Yours" – 3:37
 "Ships" – 3:40
 "The First Waltz" – 4:42
 "Pastime Endeavour" – 4:07
 "Make, Model, #" – 3:22
 "Lines Bleed" – 5:13

Awards and nominations
 "The Truth About Cats and Dogs (Is That They Die)" was voted #47 on the world's largest music poll, Triple J's Hottest 100.

2006 albums
Pony Up albums